Tudor Karunatilleke Dassanayake (died 21 January 2006) was a senior Sri Lankan Administrative Officer, he served as the 5th Governor of Central Province and has the distinction of being the first independent appointee to that post. He was formerly the Government Agent of the North Central Province.

References

2006 deaths
Sinhalese civil servants
Governors of Central Province, Sri Lanka
Year of birth missing